Corno Bianco (Weisshorn in German) is a mountain of the Pennine Alps. It's a popular climbing destination of Valsesia.

Etymology 
The literal English translation of Corno Bianco is White Horn.

Geography 
The mountain is located around 500 m east from the Dora Baltea/Sesia water divide and is totally included in Valsesia (VC, Italy). Administratively it belongs to the  comunes of Alagna Valsesia and Riva Valdobbia.

SOIUSA classification 
According to the SOIUSA (International Standardized Mountain Subdivision of the Alps) the mountain can be classified in the following way:
 main part = Western Alps
 major sector = North Western Alps
 section = Pennine Alps
 subsection = Southern  Valsesia Alps
 supergroup = Contrafforti valsesiani del Monte Rosa
 group = Costiera del Corno Bianco
 subgroup = 
 code = I/B-9.III-C.6

Access to the summit
The easiest route for the summit starts from rifugio Abate Carestia (a CAI mountain hut) and follows the southern face and ridge of the mountain passing by Lago Bianco and Lago Nero. It requires some climbing skills.

Maps
 Italian official cartography (Istituto Geografico Militare - IGM); on-line version: www.pcn.minambiente.it
 Istituto Geografico Centrale - Carta dei sentieri e dei rifugi scala 1:50.000 n. 10 Monte Rosa, Alagna e Macugnaga

Notes

Mountains of Piedmont
Mountains of the Alps
Alpine three-thousanders
Pennine Alps
Alagna Valsesia
Valsesia